Augusta's Little Misstep (Swedish: Augustas lilla felsteg) is a 1933 Swedish comedy film directed by Thor Modéen and starring Edvard Persson, Dagmar Ebbesen and Aino Taube. It was shot at the Råsunda Studios in Stockholm. The film's sets were designed by the art director Arne Åkermark.

Cast
 Edvard Persson as 	Smulle Månsson
 Dagmar Ebbesen as 	Mrs. Augusta Magnusson
 Aino Taube as 	Ingrid Månsson
 Thor Modéen as 	Holger Jönsgård
 Arthur Fischer as 	Fabrikör Hagström
 Siegfried Fischer as David Magnusson
 Rut Holm as 	Lisa Magnusson
 Hugo Jacobsson as 	Petter Söderkvist
 Nils Jacobsson as 	Einar Hallbäck
 Thyra Leijman-Uppström as 	Mrs. Klara Månsson
 Werner Ohlson as Helge Hagström
 Carl Ericson as 	Brevbärare 
 Helge Kihlberg as Biljettförsäljare 
 Margareta Schönström as 	Kontorsflicka 
 Harald Wehlnor as 	Unpleasant passenger

References

Bibliography 
 Larsson, Mariah & Marklund, Anders. Swedish Film: An Introduction and Reader. Nordic Academic Press, 2010.
 Qvist, Per Olov & von Bagh, Peter. Guide to the Cinema of Sweden and Finland. Greenwood Publishing Group, 2000.

External links 
 

1933 films
Swedish comedy films
1933 comedy films
1930s Swedish-language films
Swedish black-and-white films
Films set in Stockholm
1930s Swedish films

sv:Augustas lilla felsteg